is a former Japanese idol. She was the leader of the sixth generation cast of the late-night television variety show Shutsudō! Minsuka-police.

Publications
Breathless Saya Mochizuki celebrity photo collection, by photojournalist Masashige Ogata, Publisher Susumu Akira, issued April 2000,  (4-87761-040-5)

References

External links

1976 births
Japanese actresses
Japanese idols
Living people